Robotics;Notes is an anime television series adapted from the visual novel by 5pb. and Nitroplus. Produced by Production I.G and directed by Kazuya Nomura, the story follows Kaito Yashio and his friend Akiho Senomiya who work with their school's Robotics Club to build a giant working robot based on a popular fictional anime called Gunvarrel. At the same time a mysterious group known as The Committee of 300 plots a global conspiracy involving a series of solar storms, which they ultimately plan to use to annihilate the world's population down to one billion and establish a single world government under their control.

The series aired on Fuji TV's Noitamina slot between October 12, 2012 and March 22, 2013. Funimation Entertainment has licensed the anime for streaming on their website starting October 12, 2012. The series was released in two BD/DVD volumes in North America: part one on February 18, 2014 containing episodes 1–11, and part two on March 25, 2014 containing episodes 12–22.

Episode list

References

Lists of anime episodes
Science Adventure